John Speed's Ipswich is a graphic account of the town of Ipswich, Suffolk created by John Speed in conjunction with the dutch engraver, Jodocus Hondius, in 1610. It was featured as an inset for his map of the county of Suffolk, published in Theatre of The Empire of Great Britaine. It is the earliest extant map of Ipswich and features many buildings of the late medieval period, whilst at the same time showing streets laid out in a grid pattern which has largely been retained into the twenty first century.

Elments of John Speed's Ipswich
John Speed's map contains different key elements:

"Orwell flu."
The river labelled "Orwell flu." has been known as the River Gipping or Little Gipping.

Parish churches
Ipswich was divided into four wards, each further subdivided into parishes centred on a parish church, as follows.

Each ward had a headborough who was the leet officer for the ward.

Other religious buildings
 Ipswich Greyfriars
 Ipswich Blackfriars

Town gates

Other buildings
 Poorhouses (mislabbelled Y, actually Z): These are the Tooley's and Smart's Almshouses. These had been founded in 1550 by Henry Tooley with a further endowment provided by William Smarte (MP) in 1591. They were rebuilt as a whole in 1846.

References

History of Ipswich